Nizan Mansur de Carvalho Guanaes Gomes (born May 9, 1958 in Salvador) is a Brazilian advertising executive.

He is a co-founder and partner of ABC Group, a holding company that comprises 18 companies with operations ranging from advertising and marketing to content and entertainment. ABC Group is the largest  communications holding company in Latin America and the 18th largest communications group in the world, according to Advertising Age.          
 
Nizan was voted one of the five most influential Brazilians by Financial Times in 2010; one of the world’s 100 most creative people by Fast Company in 2011 and in 2014, Man of The Year, in Leadership’s category by GQ.

Biography
Nizan Guanaes was born in 1958, in Salvador, Bahia. He studied at Colégio Marista and graduated from Universidade Federal da Bahia with a degree in business administration. He began his career as a copywriter in his home city. Years later, he moved to Rio de Janeiro and worked at Artplan, a Brazilian advertising agency. When he moved to São Paulo in 1985, he built a reputation as a skilled advertising copywriter at DPZ and W/GGK, nowadays W/McCann.
 
In 1988, he won the Gold Lion award at Cannes Festival for the memorable television advertisement “Hitler,” created for the newspaper Folha de S.Paulo – considered one of the 100 best advertisements of all time.  
In the next year, he bought and took over DM9, advertising agency of Duda Mendonça. The agency was associated with DDB, becoming DM9DDB in 1997. In 2000, DM9 was acquired by DDB Worldwide.

In the same year, Guanaes founded internet portal iG, the second largest free internet portal in Brazil.  
Two years later, in 2002, Nizan created ABC Group with business partner João Augusto (Guga) Valente with Icatu Group as an investor.
 
In 2004, with Oskar Metsavaht, he founded the Association of Entrepreneurs Friends of UNESCO focusing to promote quality public education, culture and conserve the national historical heritage.
 
Since 2010, Nizan is a member in high level commission of UNAIDS, a program from United Nations (UN) that creates and debates solutions to prevent HIV.

Nizan is also a member of following non-profitable foundations: Clinton Global Initiative, created by Bill Clinton, with the stated mission to "strengthen the capacity of people to meet the challenges of global interdependence"; World Economic Forum, based in Switzerland and committed to engage leaders of society to shape global agendas, including health and environment; Endeavor, that identify valuable entrepreneurs to world’s sustainable growth; and Women in the World Foundation, that helps non-governmental organization (NGOs) offer solutions to build a better life for women and girls.
Nizan also contributed to create, in 2011, the Together for Girls,” a project developed to identify and combat sexual violence against girls and its social effects.

Nizan writes in Folha de S.Paulo on Tuesdays, every 14 days, on “Market” session.

Founder of ABC Group
ABC Group was founded by Nizan Guanaes and Guga Valente in March, 2002. The holding company comprises 18 companies such as Africa, DM9DDB, DM9 Rio, DM9 Sul, Escala, Loducca, Morya, Música Comunicação e Marketing, Pereira & O’Dell, b!ferraz, Interbrand, NewStyle, Rocker Heads, Sunset, Agência Tudo and CDN.

In the same year, Nizan founded Africa, middle marketing agency with four partners of DDB Brazil and Icatu Bank. In 2015, Africa is considered one of the ten largest advertising agencies in Brazil.

Recognition
In 2000, Nizan Guanaes received a gold medal in Rio Branco Order given by Brazilian ex-president, Fernando Henrique Cardoso. The Rio Branco Order is a commendation that awards important services and civic virtues in Brazil.
 
Nizan was voted the Entrepreneur of the Year in Ernst & Young Brazil in 2008. Later that year, through one of his companies, the N-Idéias, he was the mastermind of Rio Summer, a high-summer fashion week.

In 2009, he was chosen the Communication Entrepreneur of the Year by Revista IstoÉ.

In 2010, he was voted one of the five most influential Brazilians by Financial Times.

In the next year, he was nominated one of the most influential professionals in media and marketing by Advertising Age, an American magazine considered one of the most respectful in advertising field.

Also in 2011, he was voted one of the world’s 100 most creative people by Fast Company, an American magazine of business and technology. He was also Ambassador of Good Will by United Nations Educational, Scientific and Cultural Organization (UNESCO), when they recognized his support to vulnerable groups in education and social inclusion.

In 2013, was indicated by Exame magazine as one of the sixteen Brazilians entrepreneurs convicted to make history, as a businessman and creative advertiser.

In 2014, he was the Man of The Year, in Leadership’s category by GQ, an American magazine focused on men’s lifestyle.
In the same year he was voted for the third time the most trustworthy advertiser, according to the 13th Research of Reliable Brands, by Seleções magazine and the Brazilian Institute of Public Opinion and Statistics (IBOPE).

In December 2014, he won the Jeca Tatu award at 9th Copywriters Encounter, which awards the Best professionals of Brazilian advertising.

Personal life
Nizan Guanaes has one son, Antonio Guanaes. He is married with Donata Meirelles, fashion director at Vogue Brazil.

References

External links 
Ad Industry Vets Try Again With Latest Agency Venture
Meet the Man Building the Omnicom of Brazil
Business in Brazil: DDB woos Guanaes back to agency fold
The Return of Nizan Guanaes
Speech on FAAP 

Living people
1958 births
Brazilian businesspeople
People from Salvador, Bahia
Brazilian columnists
UNESCO Goodwill Ambassadors